Rivers of Latvia include:

Longest rivers
Rivers over 100 km:

List of rivers

A
Abava
- 
- Aiviekste
- Amata
-

B
Bārta
- Bērze
-

C
Cena
- Ceraukste

D

- Daugava
- Dienvidsusēja
- 
- Dubna
- Dvina

E
Engure
-

F
Feimanka

G
Gauja

H

I
Iecava
- Irbe River

J

, length of about 15 km

K

- Kūkova
-

L
Langa
- Lielā Jugla
- Lielupe
- Liepupe
- 
- 
- Ludza

M
Malta
- 
- 
- Mazā Jugla
- Mēmele
- 
- 
- Misa
- Mūsa

N
Neretiņa

O

- Ogre
- Omuļupe

P
Pededze
- Pedele
- 
- 
- 
- 
- 
-

R

- Reiu
- Rēzekne
- 
- Rītupe
- 
- 
- Rūja

S

- Salaca
- Slocene
- Stende
- 
- Suda
- Sventāja
- Svēte

T
Tartaks
- Tebra
-

V

- Venta
-

Z
Zilupe

References 

Latvia
Rivers